The Street Offences Act 1959 (7 & 8 Eliz 2 c 57) is an Act of the Parliament of the United Kingdom concerning street prostitution. It was passed following the publication of the Wolfenden report which discussed the rise in street prostitution at the time. 

Until 2009, section 1(1) of the Street Offences Act 1959 used the old term "common prostitute" until Section 16 of the Policing and Crime Act 2009 amended it to replace the term "common prostitute" with "person".

Section 2 - Procedure
Section 2 of the Street Offences Act 1959 provided that a woman cautioned by a constable in respect of her conduct in a street or public place could apply by way of complaint to an authorised court. The rule was that the woman's complaint was to be heard and determined in camera, unless the woman desired that the proceedings should be conducted in public.

Section 3 - Punishment of offences in connection with night cafes
The provisions in sections 3(2) to (5) had effect in relation to the punishment of offences to which section 26 of the Licensing Act 1949 applied. This section was repealed by Part II of Schedule 9 to the Licensing Act 1961.

Section 4 - Punishment for living on earnings of prostitution
Section 4 established the maximum term of imprisonment for living on earnings of prostitution.

Section 5 - Short title, repeal, extent and commencement
Section 5(2) was repealed by Part XI of the Schedule to the Statute Law (Repeals) Act 1974.

Section 5(4) provides that the Act came into force at the expiration of the period of one month that began on the date on which it was passed. The word "month" means calendar month. The day (that is to say, 16 July 1959) on which the Act was passed (that is to say, received royal assent) is included in the period of one month. This means that the Act came into force on 16 August 1959.

See also
Soliciting

References

External links

United Kingdom Acts of Parliament 1959
Prostitution law in the United Kingdom